Fan Mountain, 'el.  is a prominent peak in the Madison Range in Madison County, Montana in the Beaverhead National Forest.  The peak is located along the western face of the Madison Range at the northern end of the range.  It is due east of Ennis Lake and its prominence and isolation makes it easy to distinguish from Ennis in the Madison River valley.

Jack and Cedar creeks are tributaries of the Madison River with headwaters on the eastern and western face of Fan Mountain.  The mountain straddles the northern boundary of the Spanish Peaks parcel of the Lee Metcalf Wilderness area.

See also
Mountains of Madison County, Montana

Notes

Mountains of Madison County, Montana
Mountains of Montana